Mika Simmons is a British actress, film-maker and podcaster, who is known for The Happy Vagina, covering women's health. She started the Lady Garden Foundation, which aims to raise awareness of gynaecological cancers and fund research into treatments.

Early life 
Simmons was born in Greenwich, London. Her brother is journalist Keir Simmons. She grew up in Somerset and attended Wellsway Comprehensive school there before moving to Leeds to study. She graduated with a BA in English Literature and Theatre Studies from the University of Leeds. Following graduation, Simmons trained as an actress at the Drama Studio London.

Career 
In 1998 Simmons was cast in the role of "Prudence" in ITV's Frenchman's Creek, a TV film based on the novel of the same name.

In 2002, she appeared in Channel 4's TV movie, Falling Apart, a period drama, about domestic violence in a middle-class relationship in Britain. In 2011, Simmons played in the play, You Once Said Yes, which won both the Fringe First and Total Theatre awards.

Simmons has appeared in the ITV drama, Unforgotten. She has also appeared in the BBC drama Showtrial_(TV_series). In 2016, she appeared in Film London's short Balcony. The film went on to win a Crystal Bear at the Berlin Film Festival.

In 2017, Simmons was chosen as one of 40 women to front Lancôme's campaign to launch a new foundation range of 40 shades. She appeared illustrating shade number 01, "beige albatre", with the strapline "My power is acting" and a brief profile.

In 2019, Simmons wrote and directed her first short film, Rain Stops Play, a comedy short about sex and the sexes, featuring Tara Fitzgerald – who had worked with Simmons on Frenchman's Creek – and produced by Jackie Green and Roberta Moore. It won the Silver Remi for Best Comedy Short at the Houston Film Festival.  The film has been shown at Underwire Festival and Portobello Film Festival and premiered at Fragments Festival, Genesis Cinema, London. In the same year she played a part in Us Among the Stones, directed by D.R. (Dictynna) Hood who previously directed Wreckers.

In 2020 she started The Happy Vagina platform "dedicated to opening up the conversation around women's experience and gynaecological health" and her podcast, in which she discusses sex and intimacy with well-known women.

Simmons' first book The Happy Vagina was published on 4 August 2022.

Charity work 

Simmons is co-founder and co-chair of the Ginsburg Women's Health Board, an independent board, working at Government level, towards closing the gender health gap.

Simmons is one of the six women who in 2014 co-founded the Lady Garden Foundation, a charity which raises awareness and funding for gynaecological health, after her mother had died of ovarian cancer. The charity has been supported by Topshop, Sarah, Duchess of York, and Princess Beatrice. It has raised over £1,000,000 since 2014 to assist research at the Royal Marsden Hospital into treatments including the use of Olaparib, led by Simmons' friend and neighbour Dr Susana Banerjee who inspired Simmons to start the foundation.

Awards 
Simmons' directorial debut, 'Rain Stops Play', won the Silver Remi for best comedy at Houston World Film Festival.

In 2021, Simmons was chosen as one of five Harper's Bazaar visionaries for the year.

References

External links 

1976 births
Living people
British actresses